Patricia Jean Vaeth Croke (born September 4, 1926 in Colorado Springs, CO; died June 8, 2006) was an American figure skater who competed in pair skating.  With partner Jack Might, she won the silver medal at the 1941 United States Figure Skating Championships and the bronze medal at the North American Figure Skating Championships.

Results
(pairs with Jack Might)

1926 births
2006 deaths
American female pair skaters
20th-century American women
21st-century American women